"Azzurro" is an Italian pop song.

Azzurro may also refer to:
 Azzuro (film), 2000 film
 Porto Azzurro, a municipality on the island of Elba
 MS Golfo Azzurro, a North Sea trawler

See also 
 Azzurri (disambiguation), the Italian plural form of azzurro, light blue